The Northeast Delta Dental International was an annual golf tournament for professional women golfers on the Symetra Tour, the LPGA's developmental tour. The event was played from 2004 to 2013 in the Concord, New Hampshire area. Naming rights were purchased by insurer Northeast Delta Dental.

Tournament names through the years: 
2004–06: Laconia Savings Bank Golf Classic 
2007–09: USI Championship
2010–11: The International at Concord
2012–13: Northeast Delta Dental International

Winners

Tournament records

References

External links
Coverage on the Symetra Tour's official site

Former Symetra Tour events
Golf in New Hampshire
2004 establishments in New Hampshire
2013 disestablishments in New Hampshire